Hamdija Kreševljaković (18 September 1888 – 9 May 1959) was a Bosnian and Yugoslav historian.

Biography
Kreševljaković was born in Vratnik, a neighborhood in Sarajevo's Old Town. His father Mehmed (died 1929) was the son of Ibrahim Kreševljaković.

He completed schooling 1 August 1912. Three primary schools in Sarajevo, Kakanj and Gradačac carry his name.

Descendants
Kreševljaković's son Muhamed (1939–2001) served as the Mayor of Sarajevo from 1990 until 1994, during most of the Bosnian War. Muhamed's son, Nihad Kreševljaković, is a historian and the director of the Sarajevo War Theatre. Muhamed's son, Sead Kreševljaković, is a film-doc producer at Al Jazeera Balkans and the Consul General of the Republic of San Marino in Sarajevo.

Bibliography
Sarajevo za vrijeme austrougarske uprave (Sarajevo in the time of Austro-Hungarian administration, 1946)
Vodovodi i gradnje na vodi

References

1888 births
1959 deaths
Writers from Sarajevo
Bosniaks of Bosnia and Herzegovina
Bosnia and Herzegovina Muslims
Bosniak writers
Bosnia and Herzegovina essayists
20th-century Bosnia and Herzegovina historians
Yugoslav historians
Members of the Croatian Academy of Sciences and Arts
Bosnia and Herzegovina orientalists